Kensington Gardens is an eastern suburb of Adelaide, in the City of Burnside. It includes a large recreational park, Kensington Wama, or Kensington Gardens Reserve.

History 
Inhabited by the Kaurna people before settlement by Europeans, the area became known as Pile's Paddock, after James Pile, who was born in the county of Yorkshire, England, in 1800 and arrived in South Australia in 1849.

Pile's Paddock was popular as a picnic ground for a long time, before part of the land was reserved as a public recreation ground in perpetuity, as originally suggested by a Mr H.J. Holden, a member of the Tramways Trust, on condition that a tramline be run to the ground. This is now the large recreational park, Kensington Wama, or Kensington Gardens Reserve, also referred to as Kensington Gardens, created around 1908–1909 and occupying . Stonyfell Creek runs through the park. The south-eastern corner and part of South Terrace were once part of a Kaurna burial ground.

In 1906 the Bank of New South Wales obtained section 271 from William Pile and subdivided it in 1910, with the suburb renamed to Kensington Gardens around 1910, after Kensington Gardens in London.

A tramline for electric trams, part of the network of Adelaide trams and on the first line of the network to be electrified in 1909, was built as an extension to the Kensington Line, which had terminated The Parade/Gurrs Road intersection. The extension was built to serve the recently created reserve.

An annual sweet-pea exhibition was held in the reserve between 1910 and 1920, and in 1920, trees were felled in order to create the bowling green in the north-east corner. By 1923, part of the park had been laid out as a garden by a Mr A.H. Matthews of the Tramways Trust, and the name Kensington Gardens was used to refer to the suburb or the reserve. The artist and musician Gustave Barnes lived in Kensington Gardens before his death in 1921.

A large project to renovate, redevelop and revegetate the reserve, including creating a wetland to accommodate the stormwater drainage, was undertaken in 2021, with $3 million in funding from the federal government and $850,000 from the South Australian Government, among other sponsors. The reserve was officially reopened in January 2022. It was undertaken with extensive consultation with Kaurna traditional owners, whose also approved the use of its new dual name, Wama (wah-ma), meaning plain, or flat country.

References

Suburbs of Adelaide
1910 establishments in Australia